Ashakent is a rural locality (a selo) in Shtulsky Selsoviet, Kurakhsky District, Republic of Dagestan, Russia. The population was 209 as of 2010. There is 1 street.

Geography 
Ashakent is located 28 km east of Kurakh (the district's administrative centre) by road, on the Chafar River. Shtul and Kurakh are the nearest rural localities.

Nationalities 
Lezgins live there.

References 

Rural localities in Kurakhsky District